Tianyulong (Chinese: 天宇龍; Pinyin: tiānyǔlóng; named for the Shandong Tianyu Museum of Nature where the holotype fossil is housed) is an extinct genus of heterodontosaurid ornithischian dinosaur. The only species is T. confuciusi, whose remains were discovered in Jianchang County, Western Liaoning Province, China.

History
The holotype of Tianyulong, STMN 26-3 was initially reported as being from the Early Cretaceous Jehol group. The fossil was collected at a locality transliterated as Linglengta or Linglongta. Lu et al., 2010, reported that these beds were actually part of the Tiaojishan Formation, dating from the late Jurassic period at least 158.5 million years ago.

Another specimen, IVPP V17090, was described in 2012. At least four other specimens remain undescribed.

Description 
STMN 26-3 consists of an incomplete skeleton preserving a partial skull and mandible, partial presacral vertebrae, proximal–middle caudal vertebrae, nearly complete right scapula, both humeri, the proximal end of the left ulna, partial pubes, both ischia, both femora, the right tibia and fibula and pes, as well as remains of long, singular and unbranched filamentous integumentary structures. The holotype is from a subadult individual that probably measured 70 cm in length based on the proportions of the related South African species Heterodontosaurus tucki. However, Tianyulong had unusual proportions compared to other heterodontosaurids. The head was large and the legs and tail were long, but the neck and forelimbs were short.

Tianyulong has a row of long, filamentous integumentary structures on the back, tail and neck of the specimen. The similarity of these structures with those found on some theropods suggests their homology with feathers and raises the possibility that the earliest dinosaurs and their ancestors were covered with homologous dermal filamentous structures that can be considered primitive feathers ("proto-feathers").

Classification
 
Tianyulong is classified as a heterodontosaurid, a group of small ornithischian dinosaur characterized by a slender body, long tail and a pair of enlarged canine-like tusks. They were herbivorous or possibly omnivorous. Until the discovery of Tianyulong, known members of the group were restricted to the Early Jurassic of South Africa, with one genus (Fruitadens) from the Late Jurassic of the US, and possibly one additional genus (Echinodon) from the Early Cretaceous of England.

The cladogram below follows the analysis by Butler et al., 2011:

Paleobiology
 
The filamentous integumentary structures are preserved on three areas of the fossil: in one patch just below the neck, another one on the back, and the largest one above the tail. The hollow filaments are parallel to
each other and are singular with no evidence of branching. They also appear to be relatively rigid, making them more analogous to the integumentary structures found on the tail of Psittacosaurus than to the proto-feather structures found in avian and non-avian theropods. Among the theropods, the structures in Tianyulong are most similar to the singular unbranched proto-feathers of Sinosauropteryx and Beipiaosaurus. The estimated length of the integumentary structures on the tail is about 60 mm which is seven times the height of a caudal vertebra. Their length and hollow nature argue against of them being subdermal structures such as collagen fibers.
Such dermal structures have previously been reported only in derived theropods and ornithischians, and their discovery in Tianyulong extends the existence of such structures further down in the phylogenetic tree. However, the homology between the ornithischian filaments and the theropods' proto-feathers is not obvious. If the homology is supported, the consequence is that the common ancestor of both saurischians and ornithischians were covered by feather-like structures, and that groups for which skin impression are known such as the sauropods were only secondarily featherless. If the homology is not supported, it would indicate that these filamentous dermal structures evolved independently in saurischians and ornithischians, as well as in other archosaurs such as the pterosaurs. The authors (in supplementary information to their primary article) noted that discovery of similar filamentous structures in the theropod Beipiaosaurus bolstered the idea that the structures on Tianyulong are homologous with feathers. Both the filaments of Tianyulong and the filaments of Beipiaosaurus were long, singular, and unbranched. In Beipiaosaurus, however, the filaments were flattened. In Tianyulong, the filaments were round in cross section, and therefore closer in structure to the earliest forms of feathers predicted by developmental models. A study published in the journal Biology Letters rigorously tested the hypothesis that protofeathers are plesiomorphic to dinosaurs. The results supported the hypothesis that scales are plesiomorphic to dinosaurs. While it is true that feather beta keratin is present in crocodilian scales in embryonic development, it fails to support the maximum-likelihood of protofeathers being plesiomorphic.

References

External links

 

Heterodontosaurids
Ornithischian genera
Oxfordian genera
Late Jurassic dinosaurs of Asia
Paleontology in Liaoning
Feathered dinosaurs
Fossil taxa described in 2009
Taxa named by Xu Xing
Taxa named by Dong Zhiming